Liland is a village in Vågan Municipality in Nordland county, Norway.

References

Vågan
Villages in Nordland
Populated places of Arctic Norway